Agora was a darknet market operating in the Tor network, launched in 2013 and shut down in August 2015.

Agora was unaffected by Operation Onymous, the November 2014 seizure of several darknet websites (most notably Silk Road 2.0). After Evolution closed in an exit scam in March 2015, Agora replaced it as the largest darknet market.

In October 2014 to January 2015, the art collective !Mediengruppe Bitnik explored darknet culture in an exhibition in Switzerland, The Darknet: From Memes to Onionland, displaying the purchases of the Random Darknet Shopper, an automated online shopping bot that spent $100 in Bitcoins per week on Agora. The aim was to examine philosophical questions surrounding the darknet, such as the legal culpability of a piece of software or robot. The exhibition of the robot's purchases, a landscape of traded goods that included a bag of ten 120 mg Ecstasy pills "with no bullshit inside" (containing 90 mg of MDMA), was staged next door to a police station near Zürich.

In August 2015, Agora's admins released a PGP signed message announcing a pause of operations to protect the site against potential attacks that they believed might be used to deanonymize server locations:
After the closure of Agora, most activity moved over to the darknet market AlphaBay, lasting until its shutdown by law enforcement in July 2017.

References 

Defunct Tor hidden services
Defunct darknet markets
Internet properties established in 2013